A resuscitative hysterotomy, also referred to as a perimortem Caesarean section (PMCS) or perimortem Caesarean delivery (PMCD), is a hysterotomy performed to resuscitate a woman in middle to late pregnancy who has entered cardiac arrest. Combined with a laparotomy, the procedure results in a Caesarean section that removes the fetus, thereby abolishing the aortocaval compression caused by the pregnant uterus. This improves the mother's chances of return of spontaneous circulation, and may potentially also deliver a viable neonate. The procedure may be performed by obstetricians, emergency physicians or surgeons depending on the situation.

Medical uses
Where cardiac arrest occurs in a pregnant woman, irrespective of the condition of the fetus, the procedure should be performed immediately if basic and advanced life support attempts are proving unsuccessful at achieving return of spontaneous circulation, and the woman's uterus is deemed capable of causing aortocaval compression. The threshold for this is passed when the uterus is so large that the fundus may be palpated at the level of the woman's umbilicus; for a singleton pregnancy, this occurs at around 20 weeks of gestational age (but may be earlier in multiple pregnancy). Although hysterotomy is crucial for resuscitation of the mother in such situations, if the gestational age is less than approximately 24 to 25 weeks the procedure will necessarily lead to sacrifice of the fetus (or fetuses), as this is estimated to be the lower limit for fetal viability. If the fetus is over 24 weeks' gestation, Caesarean delivery also offers the best chance of rescue for the neonate.

If the mother's medical condition is such that there is no reasonable prospect of maternal resuscitation or viability (for example, after a nonsurvivable injury, or an unwitnessed arrest with prolonged pulselessness), then the procedure may be attempted immediately as a means of saving the unborn fetus primarily.

Contra-indications
The procedure should not be performed if the uterus is not judged to be large enough to cause maternal haemodynamic changes through aortocaval compression, as there is no potential benefit to the mother and the fetus or fetuses will not be viable in such an early stage of pregnancy.

Risks and complications
Potential structures that may be damaged during the procedure are as for Caesarean section, including the fetus itself and the maternal bowel, bladder, uterus and uterine blood vessels.

Technique
Once the decision to operate has been made, the procedure should be performed immediately at the site where cardiac arrest has taken place and standard basic and advanced life support resuscitation methods should continue throughout. These should include manual displacement of the uterus towards the patient's left side, to reduce aortocaval compression. If the arrest occurs in a healthcare facility that has staff on site who are capable of performing a resuscitative hysterotomy (such as at a hospital), the patient should not be moved to an operating theatre as this will delay the procedure. Out-of-hospital cardiac arrests may need to be transported to a healthcare facility first if qualified staff are not immediately available.

Other than a scalpel, no specialised surgical equipment is needed for a resuscitative hysterotomy. The American Heart Association recommends that healthcare facilities that may be required to treat a case of maternal cardiac arrest should keep in stock an emergency equipment tray for the purpose, including a scalpel with a No. 10 blade, a Balfour retractor, surgical sponges, Kelly and Russian forceps, a needle driver, sutures and suture scissors - but the procedure should commence regardless of whether the tray is available.

Basic aseptic measures, such as pouring antiseptic solution over the woman's abdomen prior to incision, may be considered as long as this adds no delay. An assistant should manually displace the gravid uterus to the woman's left throughout the procedure until the fetus has been delivered, to assist the simultaneous efforts of those resuscitating the woman. Either a classical midine incision or a Pfannenstiel incision may be used depending on operator preference; the former may theoretically give better exposure, but practising obstetricians or surgeons may be more comfortable with a Pfannenstiel approach as this is more commonly used for Caesarean sections. Once the uterus is opened, the fetus is delivered and should be resuscitated by a separate team. It may be possible to then use the abdominal incision to deliver direct cardiac massage through the (intact) diaphragm.

After the placenta is delivered, the uterus is massaged to stimulate contraction and is closed with a running locking absorbable suture and the abdomen is then closed; alternatively, the wound may be temporarily packed with sterile gauze, with definitive closure delayed until specialist obstetric help arrives or until the patient is fit for transport to a formal operating theatre. Uterotonic agents like oxytocin may be considered, balancing potential reduction of haemorrhage with the tendency of oxytocin to cause hypotension. Antibiotics should be administered to reduce infection risk if maternal survival is thought feasible at this stage of the resuscitation. If there is return of spontaneous circulation, additional uterotonic agents will likely be needed due to bleeding from uterine atony.

History
The American Heart Association first added resuscitative hysterotomy to its recommended guidelines for cardiopulmonary resuscitation and emergency cardiac care in 1992, based on limited case report evidence. Many case reports have since been published reporting that, in maternal cardiac arrest, evacuation of the uterus is often associated with abrupt return of spontaneous circulation or other improvement in the mother's condition.

References

Emergency medicine
Gynecological surgery
Caesarean sections